Matthew Zapruder (1967) is an American poet, editor, translator, and professor.

His second poetry collection, The Pajamaist, won the 2007 William Carlos Williams Award from the Poetry Society of America, and was chosen by Library Journal as one of the top ten poetry volumes of 2006. His first book, American Linden, won the Tupelo Press Editors' Prize. His most recent book of poetry, Sun Bear, brings the strangeness of poetry closer to everyday life.

Life 
His poems have appeared in The Boston Review, The Believer, Fence, Bomb, McSweeney's, Jubilat, Conduit, Harvard Review, The New Republic, The New Yorker, and The Paris Review. In 2007, he was a Lannan Literary Fellow in Marfa, Texas. He is the winner of the Tupelo Poetry Editors' Prize and the 2008 May Sarton poetry award from the American Academy of Arts and Sciences. As of late 2008, German and Slovenian language editions of his poems were planned from Luxbooks and Serpa Editions. Luxbooks is also publishing a separate German language graphic novel version of his poem "The Pajamaist."

He was co-founder (with Brian Henry) and editor-in-chief of Verse Press, which has since become Wave Books and moved from Amherst, Massachusetts to Seattle, Washington. Matthew Zapruder and Joshua Beckman, who became friends when Beckman performed a reading in Amherst, are co-editors of Wave Books.

He is an editor for Wave Books, and teaches at Saint Mary's College of California.

Zapruder received his B.A. from Amherst College, with a BA in Russian Literature, his M.A. from the University of California, Berkeley with an MA in Slavic Languages, and his M.F.A. from the MFA Program for Poets & Writers at the University of Massachusetts Amherst. He teaches in the low residency MFA program at the University of California, Riverside-Palm Desert and at the Juniper Summer Writing Institute at the University of Massachusetts, Amherst. He taught at New York University, The New School, the University of Houston, St. Mary's College of California, and University of California, Berkeley. He lives in San Francisco and is the brother of American musician and songwriter Michael Zapruder, and is the guitarist in the American band The Figments.

In 2011, he was a Guggenheim Fellow.
He had a Lannan Foundation Residency in Marfa, Texas.
He won the May Sarton prize, American Academy of Arts and Sciences.

In the fall of 2012, Zapruder's poetry was adapted and performed at Carnegie Hall with composition by Gabriel Kahane and Brooklyn Rider.

Published works

Full-length poetry
 American Linden (Tupelo Press, 2002) , 
 The Pajamaist (Copper Canyon Press, 2006) , 
 Come On All You Ghosts (Copper Canyon Press, 2010) , 
 Sun Bear (Copper Canyon Press, 2014) ,

Translations
 Secret Weapon: The Late Poems of Eugen Jebeleanu (Coffee House: 2007)

Anthologies
 Legitimate dangers: American poets of the new century, Editors Michael Dumanis, Cate Marvin, Sarabande Books, 2006,

Nonfiction
 Why Poetry (HarperCollins, 2017) ,

References

External links
Copper Canyon Press > Book Page > The Pajamaist > Matthew Zapruder
 Poems by Matthew Zapruder at Narrative Magazine.

1967 births
University of California, Riverside faculty
University of Massachusetts Amherst MFA Program for Poets & Writers alumni
Poets from Washington (state)
American print editors
Writers from Washington, D.C.
UC Berkeley College of Letters and Science alumni
Living people
Amherst College alumni
New York University faculty
The New School faculty
University of Houston faculty
University of California, Berkeley faculty
American male poets
21st-century American poets
21st-century American translators
21st-century American male writers
Bethesda-Chevy Chase High School alumni